Sushil Kumar Jain known professionally as Sushil Doshi is an Indian journalist, writer, sports commentator and the first cricket commentator in Hindi. Born to Niranjanlal and Madan Kunwar at  Indore, in the second largest Indian state of Madhya Pradesh, he graduated in engineering from Shri Govindram Seksaria Institute of Technology and Science (SGSITS) Indore and started his commentating career in 1968  at the Nehru Stadium for a Ranji Trophy match between Madhya Pradesh and Rajasthan. Over the years, he is reported to have covered nine Cricket World Cups, 85 test matches and over 400 One Day Internationals, besides several Twenty20 Internationals. His contributions are reported in making cricket commentary in Hindi popular. He has also written two books in Hindi on sports, Khel Patrakarita published in 2003 and Cricket Ka Mahabharat, published in 2016.

Awards and recognitions
The Government of India awarded him the fourth highest civilian honour of the Padma Shri, in 2016, for his contributions to sports. The commentators' box at Holkar Stadium, Indore has been named Sushil Doshi Commentators' Box in his honor.

See also 
 Holkar Stadium
 Munir Hussain

References

External links 
 
 

Recipients of the Padma Shri in sports
Year of birth missing (living people)
Writers from Indore
Journalists from Madhya Pradesh
Indian sports journalists
Indian cricket commentators
20th-century Indian journalists
Living people